George H. Conway (c. 1878 – June 20, 1939) was a Triple Crown-winning American horse trainer who worked at Glen Riddle Farm in Berlin, Maryland. He is best known for training War Admiral, who won the Triple Crown in 1937 and was selected as the American Horse of the Year over his nephew and competitor Seabiscuit. Other notable horses trained by Conway include American Flag, who won the Belmont Stakes in 1925 before training with Conway, Crusader, who won the 1926 Belmont Stakes with Conway, Maid at Arms, who was the 1925 American Champion Three-Year-Old Filly, and War Relic, who was the last horse that Conway trained. 

Conway retired to Oceanport, New Jersey, in June 1939, where he died on June 20, 1939.

References

External links
Hall of Fame profile for War Admiral

1870s births
1939 deaths
American horse trainers
People from Oceanport, New Jersey